Profundibacterium is a Gram-negative and strictly aerobic genus of bacteria from the family of Rhodobacteraceae with one known species (Profundibacterium mesophilum). Profundibacterium mesophilum has been isolated from sea-floor sediments from the Red Sea in Saudi Arabia.

References

Rhodobacteraceae
Bacteria genera
Monotypic bacteria genera